Queen Alexandra's Royal Naval Nursing Service (QARNNS) is the nursing branch of the British Royal Navy. The Service unit works alongside the Royal Navy Medical Branch.

As of 1 January 2006, according to former Ministry of Defence junior minister Don Touhig, the QARNNS had a total strength of 90 Nursing Officers and 200 Naval Nurses (ratings) out of a requirement of 330.

The Navy List (2006) listed 92 QARNNS Officers, of whom two were captains (including one DNNS/Matron-in-Chief), seven commanders, 19 lieutenant-commanders, 60 lieutenants and four sub-lieutenants.  The Navy List (1981) listed 146 QARNNS Officers, of whom one held the rank of Matron-in-Chief, two were Principal Matrons, four Matrons, 32 Superintending Sisters, 89 Senior Nursing Sisters and 13 Nursing Sisters; five of the 145 QARNNS Officers were non-nursing officers: two Senior Clerical and Quarters Officers and three Clerical and Quarters Officers.

History

In 1883, a committee determined that improvements were needed in medical and nursing care in the Royal Navy. As such, in 1884, a uniformed Naval Nursing Service was introduced, staffed by trained nurses. These nurses served on shore, initially at Haslar and Plymouth.

In 1902, Alexandra of Denmark, the queen consort of Edward VII of the United Kingdom, became President of the Nursing Staff; in her honour, the Naval Nursing service was renamed Queen Alexandra's Royal Naval Nursing Service.

Queen Alexandra's Royal Naval Nursing Service Reserve was established on 13 October 1910.

In 1914, with the outbreak of the First World War, QARNNS was significantly expanded, with many volunteers from the British Red Cross and civilian hospitals; similarly, during the Second World War, many volunteer QARNNS nurses were deployed overseas.

In 1949 a nursing branch of the Women's Royal Naval Service was formed; however, in 1960 these nurses were integrated into QARNNS, creating a single nursing service. In 1982 an integrated service was formed, allowing men to serve as nurses in QARNNS. The first man to join was Senior Nursing Officer Rajendrasen Purusrum, who was commissioned on 1 March 1983.

Although fully affiliated to the Royal Navy from 1977, QARNNS was technically a separate service until 31 March 2000, when it officially became part of the Royal Navy.

Queen Alexandra was President until her death in 1925. The following year she was succeeded by Queen Mary. Princess Alexandra became Patron in 1955.

Ranks 
Initially there were only two ranks: Nursing Sister and Head Sister. In 1911 the intermediate rank of Superintending Sister was introduced. There was no overall head of the service until the introduction of the rank of Head Sister-in-Chief on 1 August 1927. By 1937 Head Sister and Head Sister-in-Chief had been renamed Matron and Matron-in-Chief.

The ranking system changed during the Second World War.

Ratings, known as Naval Nurses, were introduced in 1960, with the integration of the WRNS nurses. Their ranking system was similar to that of Royal Navy ratings.

In 1982, in preparation for the introduction of male officers, the Nursing Officers' ranking system was changed.

In 1995 the QARNNS adopted Royal Navy ranks, although the head of the Nursing Service was no longer a one-star equivalent, the senior Captain of the QARNNS was appointed Director Naval Nursing Service (DNNS) and styled with the historic post of Matron-in-Chief.

List of Head Sisters-in-Chief/Matrons-in-Chief/Directors of Naval Nursing Services QARNNS

Head Sister-in-Chief, Naval Nursing Service
 Margaret Keenan, 1927–1929
 Mildred Hughes, 1929–1934
 Catherine Renwick, 1934–1937

Matron-in-Chief, Naval Nursing Service
 B. M. Martin, 1937–1940
 Annabella Ralph, 1940–1941
 Dame Doris Beale, 1941–1944
 Dame Matilda Goodrich, 1944–1947
 Olga Franklin, 1947–1950
 Jeannie Gillanders, 1950–1953
 Kathleen Chapman, 1953–1956
 Barbara Nockolds, 1956–1959
 Helen Moore, 1959–1962
 Joan Woodgate, 1962–1966
 Mary Fetherston-Dilke, 1966–1970
 Christina Thompson, 1970–1973
 Cynthia Cooke, 1973–1976
 Patricia Gould, 1976–1980
 Margaret Collins, 1980–1983
 Jean Robertson, 1983–1986
 Eileen Northway, 1986–1990
 Jane Titley, 1990–1994
 Captain Claire Taylor, 1994–1995

Director Naval Nursing Service
 Captain Claire Taylor, 1995–1996
 Captain Patricia Hambling, 1996–2000 
 Captain Michael Bowen, 2000–2003
 Captain Lynne Gibbon, 2003–2008
 Captain Helen Allkins, 2008–2011
 Captain Inga Kennedy, 2011–2015
 Captain Steven J. Spencer, 2015–2018
Captain Alison J. Hofman RRC, August 2018–October 2019
Captain Lisa M. Taylor, November 2019–?
Captain Neale D. Piper ARRC, June 2021–present

See also
 Queen Alexandra's Royal Army Nursing Corps
 Princess Mary's Royal Air Force Nursing Service
 Royal Navy Medical Branch

Notes

References

External links
 
 Queen Alexandra's Royal Naval Nursing Service Ratings Association

Medical units and formations of the United Kingdom
Military nursing
Naval medicine
Naval units and formations of the United Kingdom
Nursing organisations in the United Kingdom
1884 establishments in the United Kingdom